Iophon (fl. 428 BC – 405 BC) was a Greek tragic poet and son of Sophocles.

Iophon gained the second prize in tragic competition in 428 BC, Euripides being first, and Ion third. He must have been alive in 405 BC, the date of the production of The Frogs of Aristophanes, in which he is spoken of as the only good Athenian tragic poet, although it is hinted that he owed much to his fathers' assistance. He wrote fifty plays, of which only a few fragments and the following eight titles remain:  Achilles, Actaeon, Aulodoi ("The Flute-Singers"), Bacchae, Dexamenus, Iliou Persis ("The Sacking of Troy"), Pentheus, and Telephus.

It is said that Iophon accused his father before the court of the phratores of being incapable of managing his affairs, so that he might gain the guardianship of his father's fortune. Sophocles replied to this charge by reading the chorus of the Oedipus at Colonus (688 ff.), which he was currently writing. The piece so proved that he was still in possession of all his mental faculties that he was acquitted.

References
 This work in turn cites:
 Aristophanes, Frogs, 73, 78, with scholia
 Cicero, De senectute, vii. 22
 Plutarch, Moralia, 785 B
 A. Nauck, Tragicorum Graecorum fragmenta (1889)
 O. Wolff, De Iophonte poëta (Leipzig, 1884)

5th-century BC Athenians
Ancient Greek dramatists and playwrights
Tragic poets
5th-century BC writers
Year of birth unknown
Year of death unknown